Lancaster is an extinct town in Crawford County, in the U.S. state of Arkansas.

History
Lancaster was a depot on the St. Louis–San Francisco Railway. A post office called Lancaster was established in 1882, and remained in operation until 1933.

References

Geography of Crawford County, Arkansas
Ghost towns in Arkansas